Molla Kandi (also Romanized as Mollā Kandī) is a village in Mokriyan-e Shomali Rural District, in the Central District of Miandoab County, West Azerbaijan Province, Iran. At the 2006 census, its population was 594, in 119 families.

References 

Populated places in Miandoab County